Mehdi Sedghian (born 5 May 1996) is an Iranian footballer who plays as a goalkeeper for Shahin bandar ameri F.C in the Azadegan League.

Club career statistics 

Last Update:17 May 2016

References

Sepahan S.C. footballers
Fajr Sepasi players
1996 births
Living people
People from Isfahan Province
Association football goalkeepers
Iranian footballers